Gadzhyly or Gadzhily may refer to:
Hacılı (disambiguation), several places in Azerbaijan
Hacılar, Azerbaijan